The Club ULM Rotor Ptenets-2 (Russian: Птенец-2) is a Russian ultralight aircraft, designed and produced by Club ULM Rotor of Kumertau, Bashkortostan. The aircraft is supplied complete and ready-to-fly.

Design and development
The aircraft was designed to comply with the Fédération Aéronautique Internationale microlight rules. It features a strut-braced high-wing, a two-seats-in-side-by-side configuration enclosed cockpit, fixed tricycle landing gear and a single engine in pusher configuration.

The aircraft is made from aluminum tubing, with its flying surfaces covered in Dacron sailcloth. The fuselage is made from fibreglass. The tail is supported by four tubes that allow space for the pusher propeller. Standard engines available are the  Rotax 503 and  Rotax 582 two-strokes and the  HKS 700E four-stroke powerplant.

Specifications (Ptenets-2)

References

External links
Official website

2000s Russian ultralight aircraft
Homebuilt aircraft
Single-engined pusher aircraft